Mikhail Kolganov may refer to:

Michael Kolganov, Israeli canoer
Mihail Kolganov, Kazakhstani runner